Château de Malesherbesis is a French château located in Malesherbes, in the commune of Malesherbois and the department of Loiret in the Centre-Val de Loire region.

A first castle on the site is attested, the castle of Bois-Malesherbes, acquired in 1398 by Jean de Montagu, superintendent of finances to Charles VI.

References

Malesherbes
Malesherbes
Museums in Loiret
National museums of France
Historic house museums in Centre-Val de Loire
Monuments historiques of Centre-Val de Loire
Malesherbes
Ancien Régime French architecture
French Renaissance architecture
Renaissance architecture in France
14th-century establishments in France
Houses completed in the 18th century
18th-century architecture in France